Mike Sheppard (born December 20, 1988) is a Canadian rugby union player. He currently plays Lock and can also play Flanker for the Toronto Arrows in Major League Rugby (MLR).

Professional career

Sheppard played for the Ontario Blues. He previously played Ontario University Athletics rugby for McMaster University and played club rugby for Stoney Creek Camels RFC.

After captaining the Toronto Arrows during their exhibition season in 2018 he has signed on again with the club to play in their first season of Major League Rugby in 2019.

In 2021 was forwards coach of Humber Hawks. For the 2022 season, he was named captain of the Toronto Arrows.

References 

Toronto Arrows players
McMaster University alumni
McMaster Marauders
Rugby union flankers
1988 births
Living people
Canadian rugby union players
Rugby union locks
Canada international rugby union players